Dizajin (also Romanized as Dīzajīn, Dīzeh Jīn, Dizadzhin, Dīzahjīn, Dīzejīn, and Dizjin) is a village in Khandan Rural District, Tarom Sofla District, Qazvin County, Qazvin Province, Iran. At the 2006 census, its population was 56, in 22 families.

References 

Populated places in Qazvin County